Etowah County Schools is a school district in Etowah County, Alabama. The district is run by the Etowah County Board Of Education.

Schools

Elementary schools
Carlisle Elementary School
Duck Springs Elementary School
Glencoe Elementary School
Highland Elementary School
Hokes Bluff Elementary School
Ivalee Elementary School
John S. Jones Elementary School
Southside Elementary School
Walnut Park Elementary School 
West End Elementary School
Whitesboro Elementary School

Middle schools
Glencoe Middle School
Hokes Bluff Middle School
Rainbow Middle School
Sardis Middle School

High schools
Gaston School
Glencoe High School
Hokes Bluff High School
Sardis High School
Southside High School
West End High School
The Learning Center
Career Technical Center

External links

School districts in Alabama
Education in Etowah County, Alabama